This list of cemeteries in North Dakota includes currently operating, historical (closed for new interments), and defunct (graves abandoned or removed) cemeteries, columbaria, and mausolea which are historical and/or notable. It does not include pet cemeteries.

Benson County 
 St. Boniface Cemetery, Wrought-Iron Cross Site, near Selz; NRHP-listed

Emmons County 
 Old St. Mary's Cemetery, Wrought-Iron Cross Site, near Hague; NRHP-listed
 Sacred Heart Cemetery, Wrought-Iron Cross Site, Linton; NRHP-listed
 Tirsbol Cemetery, Wrought-Iron Cross Site, near Strasburg; NRHP-listed
 Wrought-iron cross sites of Holy Trinity Cemetery, Strasburg; NRHP-listed
 Wrought-iron cross sites of St. Aloysius Cemetery, Hague; NRHP-listed
 Wrought-iron cross sites of St. Mary's Cemetery, near Hague; NRHP-listed

Grand Forks County 

 B'nai Israel Synagogue and Montefiore Cemetery, Grand Forks; NRHP-listed
 WPA Stone Structures in Memorial Park and Calvary Cemetery, Grand Forks; NRHP-listed

McHenry County 
 Old Saints Peter and Paul Cemetery, Wrought-Iron Cross Site, Karlsruhe; NRHP-listed
 St. Anselm's Cemetery, Wrought-Iron Cross Site, near Berwick; NRHP-listed

McIntosh County 
 Wrought-iron cross sites of St. John's Cemetery, near Zeeland; NRHP-listed

McLean County 
 Zion Lutheran Cemetery, Wrought-Iron Cross Site, near Mercer; NRHP-listed

Pierce County 
 Old Mt. Carmel Cemetery, Wrought-Iron Cross Site, Balta; NRHP-listed
 Old Saint John Nepomocene Cemetery, Wrought-Iron Cross Site, near Orrin; NRHP-listed
 St. Anselm's Cemetery, Wrought-Iron Cross Site, near Berwick; NRHP-listed
 St. Mathias Cemetery, Wrought-Iron Cross Site, near Orrin; NRHP-listed

Renville County 
 McKinney Cemetery, Tolley; NRHP-listed

Richland County
 Fairview Cemetery, Wahpeton

Ward County 
 Our Savior's Scandinavian Lutheran Church, near Coulee; NRHP-listed
 South Wild Rice Church (also known as St. John's Lutheran Church of Richland County), near Galchutt; NRHP-listed

Cemeteries on the NRHP in North Dakota 
Cemeteries on the National Register of Historic Places (NRHP) in North Dakota

See also
 List of cemeteries in the United States

References

External links
 

North Dakota

Buildings and structures in North Dakota